Pectocarya is a plant genus of about 15 species in the family Boraginaceae. Plants in this genus are known generally as combseeds. They are small annual plants which bear tiny white flowers no more than 3 millimeters in diameter. Their fruits are nutlets which often have small projections that look like the teeth of a comb, hence their common name. The nutlets usually come in clusters of four. These plants are found mainly in western North America.

Selected species:
 Pectocarya heterocarpa – chuckwalla combseed
 Pectocarya linearis – sagebrush combseed
 Pectocarya palmeri – Palmer's grapplinghook
 Pectocarya penicillata – sleeping combseed, winged combseed, shortleaf combseed
 Pectocarya peninsularis – peninsula combseed
 Pectocarya platycarpa – broadfruit combseed
 Pectocarya pusilla – little combseed, purple prairieclover
 Pectocarya recurvata – curvenut combseed, combbur
 Pectocarya setosa – moth combseed

References

External links

 
Flora of North America
Boraginaceae genera